Crocidophora caffralis is a moth in the family Crambidae. It was described by George Hampson in 1910. It is found on Mayotte and in South Africa, Zambia and Zimbabwe.

References

Moths described in 1910
Pyraustinae